The following is a list of courts and tribunals in the Australian Capital Territory:

List of boards, commissions, courts, and tribunals

Sitting boards, commissions, courts, and tribunals
The list of sitting boards and commissions is sourced from the ACT Government Informational Portal.

Sitting boards and councils
ACT Board of Senior Secondary Studies
ACT Cultural Council
ACT Government Procurement Board
ACT Government School Education Council
ACT Heritage Council
ACT Insurance Authority Advisory Board
ACT Ministerial Advisory Council on Women
Australian Capital Territory Architects Board
Community Inclusion Board
Health Professions Registration Boards of the ACT
Medical Board of the ACT
Ministerial Advisory Council on Ageing
Minister's Youth Advisory Council
Territory Records Advisory Council

Sitting commissions
Independent Competition and Regulatory Commission
ACT Commissioner for Sustainability and the Environment

Sitting courts
Children's Court of the Australian Capital Territory
Coroner's Court of the Australian Capital Territory
Magistrates Court of the Australian Capital Territory
Supreme Court of the Australian Capital Territory

Sitting tribunals
ACT Civil and Administrative Tribunal

Abolished boards, courts and tribunals

Abolished boards

Abolished courts

Abolished tribunals

See also

Australian court hierarchy
ACT Government

References

Lists of courts and tribunals in Australia

Courts and tribunals